Koketso Mmathabo Mary Tlailane (born 7 December 1992) is a South African soccer player who plays as a defender for the South Africa women's national team.

International career
Tlailane appeared in two matches for the South Africa women's national soccer team in 2019. She was on the South Africa squad at the 2018 Africa Women Cup of Nations but did not appear in any matches.

References

1992 births
Living people
South African women's soccer players
South Africa women's international soccer players
Women's association football defenders